Chester is an unincorporated community in Fremont County, Idaho, United States. Chester has a post office with ZIP code 83421.

History
Chester's population was estimated at 250 in 1909, and was 100 in 1960.

Climate
According to the Köppen climate classification,Chester has a warm-summer humid continental climate (Köppen climate classification: ''Dfb).

References

Unincorporated communities in Fremont County, Idaho
Unincorporated communities in Idaho